Andreas Konstantinou is a Greek actor. He appeared in more than twelve films since 1995.

Selected filmography

Awards

References

External links 

Living people
Greek male film actors
Year of birth missing (living people)
Actors from Thessaloniki